openpilot is an open source, semi-automated driving system developed by comma.ai. openpilot operates as a replacement for OEM advanced driver-assistance systems with the objective of improving visual perception and electromechanical actuator control. It allows users to modify their existing car with increased computing power, enhanced sensors, and continuously-updated driver assistance features that improve with user-submitted data.

History 
comma.ai was founded in September 2015 by George Hotz. The first version of openpilot was revealed a few months later in a Bloomberg article, showing functionality on a 2016 Acura ILX. The video and article instigated a cease and desist letter from the California Department of Motor Vehicles, claiming comma.ai was testing a self-driving car without a license.

openpilot was packaged into a small, shippable device called the "comma one", announced at TechCrunch Disrupt. On October 27, 2016, NHTSA issued a Special Order to comma.ai demanding detailed information about the comma one, to determine if the device complies with legally required Federal Motor Vehicle Safety Standards. comma.ai responded in a tweet from Shenzhen, China, announcing the cancellation of the comma one.

comma.ai open-sourced openpilot a month later, on November 30, 2016, emphasizing its intended use for research, without any warranty.

On January 7, 2020, comma.ai introduced the $999 "comma two" device at CES in Las Vegas. 

At comma's 2021 comma_con convention, the company released the "comma three devkit". This model uses two fish eye cameras oriented to the front and a long distance camera oriented to the rear to analyze the car's surroundings. 

Hotz announced in October 2022 that he was leaving comma.ai.

Features

Automated lane-centering 
openpilot uses machine learning, trained with user driver data, to determine the safest path on the road. This improves perception on roads without lane markings vs. lane-centering by tracking current lane lines.

Adaptive cruise control 
openpilot maintains a safe following distance from the vehicle ahead. It is capable of driving in stop-and-go traffic with no user intervention. It uses OpenStreetMap's road curvature and speed limit data to allow slowing on sharp turns and setting the vehicle's desired speed to the current speed limit on certain community-maintained forks of the main repository.

Driver monitoring 
openpilot recognizes the driver's face; if the driver is distracted, openpilot warns the driver. If the driver is distracted for more than six seconds, openpilot decelerates the vehicle to a stop, and audibly alerts the user.

Assisted lane change 
openpilot uses the model to change lanes when the user engages the turn signal: a nudge is required on the steering wheel to confirm the lane change. openpilot also interacts with the blind spot monitor on certain makes and models to block the lane change in the event a car is detected by the blind spot monitor.

Software updates 
openpilot receives over-the-air software updates via WiFi or a cellular phone network, (OTA updates).

Supported cars 
At launch, openpilot supported the Honda Civic and the Acura ILX. Support for more vehicles and brands has been added through open source contribution. The currently officially supported vehicles list contains more than 200 entries and can be checked on https://comma.ai/vehicles

Community 
Development is supported by an open-source community using Discord and GitHub.

comma.ai has released tools and guides to help developers port their cars. In addition, they released tools to let users review their drives.

Forks 
comma.ai maintains the openpilot codebase and releases, and there is a growing community that maintains various forks of openpilot. These forks consist of experimental features such as stop light detection.

Pre-Autopilot Tesla models have been retrofitted with openpilot through a community fork. Chrysler and Jeep models have also gained support through community contributions.

There are over 6,600 forks of the openpilot GitHub repository.

References

2016 software
Free and open-source software
Self-driving cars